Washington Street may refer to:

United States
 Washington Street (Alexandria), Virginia
 Washington Street, in Atlanta, Georgia, a fashionable residential boulevard around 1890-1910; see Washington–Rawson
 Washington Street, in Augusta, Georgia, former street in Augusta, Georgia; see Transportation in Augusta, Georgia 
 Washington Street (Baltimore), Maryland, running near Johns Hopkins Hospital
 Washington Street (Boston), Massachusetts, running from downtown Boston southwest to the Massachusetts/Rhode Island border (including other Washington Streets in Boston)
 Washington (MBTA station) (disambiguation), several MBTA stations known as Washington Street
 Washington Street (Cape May, New Jersey), New Jersey
 Washington Street (Indianapolis), Indiana, the street that divides Indianapolis's northern and southern halves, originally part of the National Road and still, outside of I-465, the route of US 40
 Washington Street (Manhattan), New York City

Ireland
 Washington Street, Cork

See also
 Washington (disambiguation)
 Washington Avenue (disambiguation)
 Washington Boulevard (disambiguation)
 Washington Street Historic District (disambiguation)